Eight ships of the Royal Navy have borne the name HMS Albacore, after the Albacore, a species of fish:

  was a 16-gun sloop, formerly the American privateer Royal Louis.
  was a 16-gun sloop launched at Rotherhithe. She captured several privateers before she was sold in 1802.
  was an 18-gun sloop launched in 1804 and sold in 1815. She became a merchantman, sailing out of Guernsey. She was lost on 12 October 1821 while sailing from Buenos Aires to Barbados. 
  was a schooner launched in 1828 and sold in 1832.
  was a wooden screw gunboat launched in 1856, the nameship of the 1855 . She was used as a tank vessel from 1874, was hulked in 1882 and was broken up in 1885.
  was a composite screw gunboat launched in 1883, the nameship of the 1883 . She was sold in 1906.
  was a destroyer launched in 1906 and purchased in 1909. She was reclassified as a  destroyer in 1913 and was sold in 1919.
  was an  launched in 1942 and broken up in 1963.

Royal Navy ship names